Comptosia insignis is a species of bee flies in the family Bombyliidae.

References

Bombyliidae
Insects described in 1849
Insects of Australia